Constantinos Mavromichalis (born 5 March 1987, in Helsinki) is a Finnish actor, who plays a young boy named Romeo Aro in the Finnish soap series Salatut elämät. Mavromichalis' father is Greek, and both Finnish and Greek are spoken at his home. Mavromichalis matriculated from the high school of Kallio in spring 2006.

References

Finnish male actors
Finnish people of Greek descent
1987 births
Living people